Pariah is a 2011 American drama film written and directed by Dee Rees. It tells the story of Alike (Adepero Oduye), a 17-year-old Black teenager embracing her identity as a lesbian. It premiered at the 2011 Sundance Film Festival and was awarded the Excellence in Cinematography Award.

In 2022, the film was selected for preservation in the United States National Film Registry by the Library of Congress as being "culturally, historically or aesthetically significant." It is currently the most recent film chosen to be in the registry.

Plot

Alike ("Lee") is a 17-year-old Black girl who hangs out at clubs with her openly lesbian friend Laura. Alike slowly and firmly comes to terms with her own identity as a butch lesbian, comfortable in baggy clothes and male underwear. Her mother Audrey approves of neither her clothes nor her friendship with Laura.  Harboring growing suspicions about Alike's sexuality, Audrey forces her to wear feminine clothing and tries to stem any influence from Laura by pushing Alike to instead make friends with Bina, a girl from her church. Alike has a better relationship with her father Arthur, who is a police detective.

Alike begins to develop feelings for Bina, and starts spending more time with her than with Laura, much to Laura's annoyance. Arthur comes back late a few times from work, which angers Audrey and the two of them fight often. Arthur does not think much about the changes in Alike's life. Saying she is going through a phase, he is supportive of her, although he cautions her on steering clear of the area where there is a lesbian bar, saying it's not safe.

One night after going to see an alternative rock band, Alike and Bina are alone in Bina's room when Bina begins caressing and kissing Alike.  Alike is at first hesitant, having had no prior experience with physical intimacy.  However, she eventually responds and the two spend the night together.  In the morning, Alike talks to Bina about where they want their relationship to go, but Bina says there is no relationship, as she is not "really gay-gay" and only regarded their physical encounter as playful indulgence.  Her only further interest in Alike seems to be her concern that Alike not tell anyone else about the two of them.  Hurt and upset, Alike leaves and returns home and cries for hours.

During that time, Audrey and Arthur have an explosive fight about Alike. Despite her sister Sharonda's protests, Alike decides to intervene in the fight and she comes out to her parents. Disgusted, Audrey viciously attacks Alike while Arthur tries to restrain her. Alike flees to Laura's house where the two friends reconcile. Audrey then tries to forget that anything happened, which annoys the rest of her family. Arthur comes to meet with Alike, apologizes for Audrey's actions and requests that Alike come back home, offering half-hearted assurance that if she does, "things will be different".  Alike says that she will not return home, but instead plans to move to California to begin college early.  She assures her father that, "I'm not running; I'm choosing."

Before leaving, Alike makes an attempt to reconcile with her mother as well.  However, her mother refuses to accept her and offers only that she will be praying for Alike.  Arthur, Sharonda and Laura see Alike off on her journey west and the film ends with Alike reading a poem she wrote; its theme echoes her words to her father that she is not running, but choosing.

Cast
 Adepero Oduye as Alike
 Aasha Davis as Bina, Alike's love interest
 Charles Parnell as Arthur, Alike's father
 Kim Wayans as Audrey, Alike's mother
 Pernell Walker as Laura, Alike's best friend
 Sahra Mellesse as Sharonda, Alike's younger sister

Production
The film is a feature-length expansion of writer/director Dee Rees’ award-winning 2007 short film Pariah. Spike Lee was one of the executive producers. Filming took place in and around New York City, predominantly in the Fort Greene neighborhood in Brooklyn.

Reception and legacy
Pariah premiered at the 2011 Sundance Film Festival and was awarded the Excellence in Cinematography Award. The film was shown at the Toronto International Film Festival in September 2011.

On review aggregator Rotten Tomatoes, the film holds an approval rating of 95% based on 114 reviews, with an average rating of 7.87/10. The website's critics consensus reads: "Pulsing with authenticity and led by a stirring lead performance from Adepero Oduye, Pariah is a powerful coming out/coming-of-age film that signals the arrival of a fresh new talent in writer/director Dee Rees." On Metacritic, the film has a weighted average score of 79 out of 100, based on 34 critics, indicating "generally favorable reviews".

In his New York Times article, film critic A.O. Scott wrote that to watch Adepero Oduye play Alike "is to experience the thrill of discovery." Scott continued by saying that "Pariah has a point to make, and a point of view to argue, but it also, above all, wants to illuminate an individual universe of meaning and emotion." 

AutoStraddle placed the movie third on its list of the top 200 lesbian, queer and bisexual movies of all time.

Awards and nominations
 African-American Film Critics Association
 Best Picture (runner-up)
 Best Independent Film (Winner)
 Best Breakthrough Performance, (Adepero Oduye) (Winner)
 Black Reel Awards
 Best Picture (Nominated)
 Best Director: Dee Rees, (Nominated)
 Best Actress: Adepero Oduye, (Nominated)
 Best Screenplay: Dee Rees, (Nominated)
 Best Supporting Actress:
 Kim Wayans, (Nominated)
 Pernell Walker, (Nominated)
 Best Ensemble, (Nominated)
 Best Breakthrough Performance:
 Kim Wayans, (Nominated)
 Adepero Oduye, (Winner)
 Black Film Critics Circle
 Best Picture (runner-up)
 Best Director: (Dee Rees), Winner
 Best Original Screenplay: (Dee Rees), Winner
 Best Independent Film, Winner
 Best Breakthrough Performance: (Adepero Oduye), Winner
 Independent Spirit Awards
 Best Female Lead, Adepero Oduye (Nominated)
 John Cassavetes Award (Winner)
 44th NAACP Image Awards
 Outstanding Independent Motion Picture (Winner)
 Outstanding Motion Picture (Nominated)
 Outstanding Actress in a Motion Picture:
 Adepero Oduye - "Pariah" (Nominated)
 Outstanding Supporting Actor in a Motion Picture:
 Charles Parnell - "Pariah" (Nominated)
 Outstanding Supporting Actress in a Motion Picture:
 Kim Wayans - "Pariah" (Nominated)

See also 
 List of LGBT-related films directed by women
 List of black films of the 2010s

References

External links
 
 
 
Pariah: Song of the Self an essay by Cassie da Costa at the Criterion Collection

2011 films
2011 LGBT-related films
2011 directorial debut films
2011 independent films
2010s American films
2010s English-language films
American teen LGBT-related films
African-American films
African-American LGBT-related films
American LGBT-related films
Lesbian-related films
LGBT-related coming-of-age films
LGBT-related drama films
Juvenile sexuality in films
Films set in Brooklyn
Films shot in New York City
Films directed by Dee Rees
Films about mother–daughter relationships
Films about father–daughter relationships
Films about anti-LGBT sentiment
Features based on short films
John Cassavetes Award winners
Sundance Film Festival award winners
United States National Film Registry films